The Regional Council of Tuscany (Consiglio Regionale della Toscana) is the legislative assembly of Tuscany.

It was first elected in 1970, when the ordinary regions were instituted, on the basis of the Constitution of Italy of 1948.

Composition
The Regional Council of Tuscany was originally composed of 50 regional councillors. In the 2005 regional election the number of councillors increased to 65, while in the 2010 regional election it was reduced to 53.

Following the 2014 regional electoral reform the number of regional councillors was reduced to 40, with an additional seat reserved for the President of the Region.

Political groups
After the 2020 regional election, the Regional Council of Tuscany is currently composed of the following political groups:

Historical composition

Notes

Presidents
This is a list of the Presidents of the Regional Council (Italian: Presidenti del Consiglio regionale):

Notes

See also
Regional council
Politics of Tuscany
President of Tuscany

References

External links
Regional Council of Tuscany

Politics of Tuscany
Italian Regional Councils
Tuscany